Victor Pineda may refer to:

Victor Pineda (activist) (born 1978), American scholar and disability rights advocate
Victor Pineda (soccer) (born 1993), American soccer player